Triple Jeopardy may refer to:

 Triple jeopardy or triple oppression, a theory about discrimination and oppression
 Triple jeopardy, a legal concept, to be tried thrice for the same crime; see double jeopardy

Sports and games
 Triple Jeopardy!, a round on the TV game show Jeopardy! used as the third round in Celebrity Jeopardy! (2022 TV series)
 "Triple Jeopardy Championship", a pro-wrestling championship in Pro Wrestling eXpress

Litarature 
 Triple Jeopardy (book), a 1952 Rex Stout anthology of mystery fiction
 Triple Jeopardy (book), a book by Roger Parloff
 Triple Jeopardy: The Autobiography of Angela Lynn Douglas (book), a 1983 autobiography by Angela Lynn Douglas
 Triple Jeopardy: Elderly, Poor, African-American Women and Their Barriers to Health Care and Screening for Breast and Cervical Cancer (thesis), an award winning thesis by Kathie-Ann Joseph
 Triple Jeopardy (book), a 2010 novel by David L. Hoof
 Triple Jeopardy (book), a 2019 novella by Anne Perry

Other uses
 "Triple Jeopardy" (episode), an award winning episode of Deadliest Catch; see List of awards and nominations received by Deadliest Catch
 "Triple Jeopardy" (segment), an episode of The Invincible Iron Man in the 1966 TV series The Marvel Super Heroes

See also

 Multiple jeopardy, a theory about discrimination and oppression
 
 Jeopardy (disambiguation)
 Triple (disambiguation)